In music, Op. 149 stands for Opus number 149. Compositions that are assigned this number include:

 Beach – Cabildo
 Klebe – Chlestakows Wiederkehr